Burma is a 2014  Tamil language crime thriller directed by Dharani Dharan and produced by Sudharshan Vembutty under the banner Square Stone Films. It stars Michael Thangadurai and Reshmi Menon, while Sampath Raj, Atul Kulkarni, Karthik Sabesh and Madhu Raghuram play supporting roles. The music was scored by Sudharshan M Kumar, while cinematography and editing were handled by Yuva and Vivek Harshan. The film released on 12 September 2014.

Cast 

 Michael Thangadurai as Paramanandan (Burma)
 Reshmi Menon as Kalpana (Noodles)
 Sampath Raj as Guna
 Atul Kulkarni as Bothra Seth
 Karthik Sabesh as Boomer
 Kani Kusruti as Clara
 Deepak Paramesh as Charles
 Madhu Raghuram as Maaran
 Tarun Master as Shankar, Kalpana's father
 K. G. Mohan as Velu
 Thanjai Mahendran as Kumar
 Sai Dheena as Broker Ravi
 Diana Vishalini as Devi
 Sharath as Maruthi
 C. M. Bala as Arunachalam
 Rajkumar as Thaadi Mohan
 Chandana as Jessica
 Jayaraj as Karuppu
 Ram as Brucelee
 Hitler as Jetlee
 Jasper as Don
 Madurai Joseph as IG Vijayakumar
 K. Rajasekhar as Rummy Raja
 Thamizharasu as Moorthi
 Prathap Rajan as IG Kuzhanthai Velu

Production
Dharani Dharan after quitting his IT job and assisting director Susi Ganesan in Kanthaswamy and Shortcut Romeo wrote a couple of "off-beat scripts" but found out that there was "no market for them" as no big production house approved of the scripts. Sudharshan Vembutty, however, liked the script of Burma and agreed to fund the film. Dharani Dharan had plans to cast popular actors for the lead roles in Burma and met many "top heroes" but said that nobody believed in his script or that they were not interested in the project since it was not produced by a known studio. Therefore, he decided to work with newcomers and cast Michael Thangadurai and Reshmi Menon, who had both appeared in few low-profile films only, in the lead roles. Atul Kulkarni was recruited for a pivotal role, that of a "car financier, who appoints people to recover the car, if funds don't come on time", with the actor telling that he experimented with his hairdo, and got a new hair colour. According to Dharanidharan, Kulkarni and Sampath Raj, are the only two popular actors in the cast, who agreed to work for lesser remuneration than what they usually charge.

Before the actual shoot began, Dharani Dharan shot every scene with Michael, on a 5D camera for one month, like a rehearsal. A luxury vehicle was needed for the film and he approached a BMW team and showed them the script, who were impressed with it and lent a BMW X6 worth  1.5 crores for the shoot. Most of the story takes place in real places in north Chennai and the team shot in highly crowded places like Royapuram, Pudhupet and Ennore, with the director stating that filming in those locations was "extremely challenging".

Soundtrack

Sudharshan M Kumar composed the soundtrack and film score of Burma. The audio rights were purchased by Think Music India. The lyrics were written by Kabilan Vairamuthu, Aaryan Dinesh, Tupakeys (MC Rude, MC Akram) and S.A. The album features eight tracks and was released on 28 August 2014 by C. V. Kumar at the Suryan FM 93.5 studio in Chennai along with the film's theatrical trailer.

Critical reception
Baradwaj Rangan wrote, "There’s so much attitude, atmosphere, flavour and wry comedy in Burma that I readily forgave the minor sins and its major one — the story takes a detour into a race-against-time thriller, and there really isn’t all that much tension. But Dharanidharan doesn’t try to pump in life artificially — everything is beautifully organic, one of a piece...Burma made me so high on how crime can entertain that I almost forgot it doesn’t pay". The New Indian Express wrote, "With  interlinking story lines, a smartly written screenplay and slick narration, the film keeps one engaged for its crisp 96 minutes of viewing time....Burma is a rollicking, breezy roller-coaster ride". IANS gave it a score of 2.5 stars out of 5 and wrote, "Burma could've easily been an excellent film with its interesting premise and an equally exciting non-linear narrative...Dharani uses the narrative style of Guy Ritchie films, but what he misses out is the deft execution style of the latter...Nevertheless, Burma is still a reasonably good watch with some decent performances". Sify called the film a "decent crime-thriller" that was "quite racy and entertaining" but added, "the script is a mess. Some scenes are badly written and incoherent".

References

External links
 
 
 

2014 films
Indian crime thriller films
2014 crime thriller films
2010s heist films
2014 black comedy films
Indian black comedy films
Indian heist films
2010s Tamil-language films
Films about automobiles
2014 directorial debut films